General's Son is a 1990 South Korean crime film directed by Im Kwon-taek. It stars Park Sang-min as Kim Du-han, a gangster who discovers that he is the son of General Kim Jwa-jin. The film is the first in a trilogy, followed by General's Son II (1991) and General's Son III (1992).

General's Son was the most highly attended film in South Korea in both 1990 and 1991.

Plot
Kim Du-han lost his mother at the age of eight, and he survives on the streets as a singing beggar. His natural-born fighting skills places him on the mean streets of Jongno with the kisaeng house Wumigwan at the center. He is soon recognized for his incredible strength and ability. He finds out through Shin Ma-jeok, the head of a student gang, that he is the son of General Kim Jwa-jin who fought against the Japanese army. Meanwhile, the Yakuzas expand their sphere of influence and try to take over the Jongno streets but Du-han protects the Korean vendors of Jongno and wins their respect. When the head of Wumigwan, Kim Gi-hwan is arrested, Du-han becomes the leader of the Jongno gang.

Cast

Awards
 Grand Bell Awards: Best New Actor (1991)

References

External links
 
 
 

1990s action films
1990 crime drama films
South Korean crime action films
South Korean crime drama films
South Korean neo-noir films
Films about organized crime in Korea
Films directed by Im Kwon-taek
1990s Korean-language films
Films set in Korea under Japanese rule
South Korean films based on actual events